The men's 94 kg (206.8 lbs) Semi-Contact category at the  W.A.K.O. World Championships 2007 in Coimbra was the second heaviest of the male Semi-Contact tournaments being the equivalent of super heavyweight when compared to Full-Contact's weight classes.  There were fourteen fighters from three continents (Europe, Africa and North America) taking part in the competition.  Each of the matches was three rounds of two minutes each and were fought under Semi-Contact rules.

As there were too few fighters for a tournament designed for sixteen, two of the men received a bye through to the quarter finals.  The gold medal was won by Pero Gazilj from Croatia who defeated opponent Michael Decain from Switzerland in the final by points decision.  The two defeated semi finalists, Petr Kotik from Czech Republic and Great Britain's Mark Brown, won bronze medals.

Results
These matches were decided on points.

See also 
 List of WAKO Amateur World Championships
 List of WAKO Amateur European Championships
 List of male kickboxers

References

External links 
 WAKO World Association of Kickboxing Organizations Official Site

Kickboxing events at the WAKO World Championships 2007 Coimbra
2007 in kickboxing
Kickboxing in Portugal